

This is a list of the National Register of Historic Places listings in Las Animas County, Colorado.

This is intended to be a complete list of the properties and districts on the National Register of Historic Places in Las Animas County, Colorado, United States. The locations of National Register properties and districts for which the latitude and longitude coordinates are included below, may be seen in a map.

There are 37 properties and districts listed on the National Register in the county.  Another 3 properties were once listed but have been removed.

Current listings

|}

Former listings

|}

See also

 List of National Historic Landmarks in Colorado
 National Register of Historic Places listings in Colorado

References

Las Animas